Chemini is a town in northern Algeria, in the province of Béjaïa, about 60 km southwest of the provincial capital. As of 2008, the town has a population of 15,274.

Geography 
Chemini is located on the bank of Soummam River, in the western part of the Béjaïa Province. It borders Akfadou to the north, Seddouk to the east, Ouzellaguen to the south and Bouzeguene to the west.

Administrative divisions 
In 1984, the commune of Chemini was formed from the following localities:

History 
The commune of Chemini corresponds to the former commune of Djenane during the French occupation. The commune of Djenane was in turn under the Department of Sétif, former sub-prefecture of the Department of Constantine until 1957. After Algerian independence, Chemini became a commune of the Sétif Province before getting integrated into Béjaïa Province when it was created in 1974.

Famous people 

 Mabrouk Belhocine, a writer, historian and activist for Algerian independence, as well as a former senior official of the Provisional Government of the Algerian Republic
 Mohand Amokrane Maouche, the first president of the Algerian Football Federation
 Boudjemâa Agraw, real name Boudjemaâ Ouddane, a Kabyle singer
 Iris , real name Mohand-Lyazid Chibout, a Kabyle author, poet, editor and journalist
 Mohand Akli Haddadou, a Kabyle linguist and author

References 

Communes of Béjaïa Province
Béjaïa Province